Adamovsky or Adamovskiy (masculine), Adamovskaya (feminine), or Adamovskoye (neuter) may refer to:
 Adamovsky District, a district of Orenburg Oblast, Russia
 Adamovsky (surname)

See also
 Adamovka, a list of places with the name
 Adamovo (disambiguation)